A sidara is a cap that can be folded flat when not being worn. Although it has been associated with various military forces since the middle of the 19th century, the sidara was associated with both military and civilians in Iraq.

This began On August 23, 1921, when Faisal I, assumed the throne of Iraq as the first king of the modern Iraq from the UK. Faisal dreamed of building a modern state in Iraq, and introducing a number of traditions and modern political and social systems to the country, a country that had just emerged from the Ottoman rule, which lasted nearly four centuries. Among these changes, the  king wanted to find a national dress for the head and to distinguish the people of Iraq from neighbouring, like the Ottomans who wear Fez or, and the Arabs in the Arabian peninsula who wear thawb. It was distributed for the first time to ministers by Rustam Haider, one of the king's advisors at the time, The sedara was first worn by King Faisal I to encourage people to wear it, and from this it was named after him (Faisaliah) which is the second name for sidara. The sidara was mainly used in big cities, like Baghdad and Mosul.

Sidara today 
Since the fall of the monarchy in Iraq, the popularity of the sidara has gradually declined. The last major figure to wear it was President Ahmed Hassan al-Bakr. Since the eighties of the twentieth century, it has become uncommon to see a person wearing the sidara in Iraq, except in some particular places in both Baghdad and Mosul, and on occasions that bear a traditional character. The sidara has disappeared from the Iraqi military uniform in the 21st century.

References

Iraqi culture
Hats